Kentfield (formerly Ross Landing, Tamalpais, and Kent) is a census-designated place (CDP) in Marin County, California, United States, just north of San Francisco. The population was 6,808 at the 2020 census. The ZIP codes are 94904 for street addresses, and 94914 for PO boxes, and are shared with the neighboring community of Greenbrae.

History
In 1857, James Ross (1812–1862) bought Rancho Punta de Quentin. Ross, a Scot who had arrived in San Francisco from Australia in 1848 and made his fortune in the wholesale liquor business, set up a trading post called "Ross Landing". Steamers would come up Corte Madera Creek to the landing there. Albert Emmett Kent bought the land from the Ross estate in 1871. Kent built an estate called Tamalpais, later applied to the nearby railroad station. His son, William Kent, was a US Congressman, philanthropist and founder of Muir Woods.

The name of the railroad station was changed to Kent in the 1890s, and finally to Kentfield with the opening of the first post office in 1905.

Geography
Kentfield is located on the eastern slopes of Mount Tamalpais. It is at  It is bordered to the north by Ross, to the northeast by San Rafael, and to the south by Larkspur.

Climate
Freezing temperatures ( or below) occur an average of 3.8 days each year.

Kentfield has one of the highest average rainfall totals of any community in the San Francisco Bay Area; normally  of rain falls each year on an average of 68.9 days. Although heavy snow sometimes falls on nearby Mount Tamalpais, snow is rare in Kentfield; however, trace amounts were reported on January 28 and December 13, 1972.

Demographics

2010
The 2010 United States Census reported that Kentfield had a population of 6,485. The racial makeup of Kentfield was 5,908 (91.1%) White, 35 (0.5%) African American, 10 (0.2%) Native American, 224 (3.5%) Asian, 7 (0.1%) Pacific Islander, 95 (1.5%) from other races, and 206 (3.2%) from two or more races. Hispanic or Latino of any race were 299 persons (4.6%).

The Census reported that 6,463 people (99.7% of the population) lived in households, 13 (0.2%) lived in non-institutionalized group quarters, and 9 (0.1%) were institutionalized.

There were 2,572 households, out of which 893 (34.7%) had children under the age of 18 living in them, 1,562 (60.7%) were opposite-sex married couples living together, 200 (7.8%) had a female householder with no husband present, 78 (3.0%) had a male householder with no wife present.  There were 83 (3.2%) unmarried opposite-sex partnerships, and 25 (1.0%) same-sex married couples or partnerships. 600 households (23.3%) were made up of individuals, and 285 (11.1%) had someone living alone who was 65 years of age or older. The average household size was 2.51.  There were 1,840 families (71.5% of all households); the average family size was 2.97.

The population was spread out, with 1,660 people (25.6%) under the age of 18, 265 people (4.1%) aged 18 to 24, 1,092 people (16.8%) aged 25 to 44, 2,206 people (34.0%) aged 45 to 64, and 1,262 people (19.5%) who were 65 years of age or older.  The median age was 47.0 years. For every 100 females, there were 91.1 males.  For every 100 females age 18 and over, there were 86.0 males.

The homeowner vacancy rate was 0.8%; the rental vacancy rate was 8.1%.  5,202 people (80.2% of the population) lived in owner-occupied housing units and 1,261 people (19.4%) lived in rental housing units.

2000
As of the census of 2000, there were 6,351 people, 2,506 households, and 1,806 families residing in the CDP. The racial makeup of the CDP in 2010 was 88.3% non-Hispanic White, 0.5% non-Hispanic Black or African American, 0.1% Native American, 3.4% Asian, 0.1% Pacific Islander, 0.2% from other races, and 2.7% from two or more races. 4.6% of the population were Hispanic or Latino of any race.

There were 2,506 households, out of which 34.2% had children under the age of 18 living with them, 62.3% were married couples living together, 7.6% had a female householder with no husband present, and 27.9% were non-families. 21.5% of all households were made up of individuals, and 8.4% had someone living alone who was 65 years of age or older.  The average household size was 2.52 and the average family size was 2.94.

In the CDP, the population was spread out, with 25.0% under the age of 18, 3.4% from 18 to 24, 22.0% from 25 to 44, 32.9% from 45 to 64, and 16.7% who were 65 years of age or older.  The median age was 45 years. For every 100 females, there were 93.7 males.  For every 100 females age 18 and over, there were 88.9 males.

The median income for a household in the CDP was $117,457, and the median income for a family was $154,673. Males had a median income of $88,000 versus $59,286 for females. The per capita income for the CDP was $79,459.  About 2.8% of families and 3.7% of the population were below the poverty line, including 4.7% of those under age 18 and 1.9% of those age 65 or over.

Educational institutions

Anthony G. Bacich Elementary School
A.G. Bacich Elementary School is a California Distinguished School that hosts grades K-4. During the 2009-2010 school year, Bacich Elementary School served approximately 600 children. The school is racially homogeneous, with 91% white. The next largest ethnicity is Asian, at 5%. As of 2010, there were 41 teachers. As of 2009, Bacich has an Academic Performance Index of 946 out of 1000, putting it in the top ranking in the state of California.

Adeline E. Kent Middle School
Adeline E. Kent Middle School is a co-ed California Distinguished School and a California Gold Ribbon School that hosts grades 5-8.  As of 2014 it enrolled 522 students.
The school is racially homogeneous, with over 90% white.  The next largest ethnicity is Asian, at 3%.  The school consists of 38 classrooms, as well as a multipurpose room, a gym, and a library.  As of 2003, there were 32 teachers.  As of 2009, Kent has an Academic Performance Index of 944 out of 1000, putting it in the top ranking in the state of California.

Marin Catholic High School

Marin Catholic High School, a Roman Catholic college preparatory, serves young boys and girls in the Catholic tradition. The student population currently numbers around 725. The school is owned by the Archdiocese of San Francisco.

College of Marin

The main campus for the College of Marin is in Kentfield, and is across the street from Kent Middle School. College of Marin is well known for its theatre department, with the highest transfer acceptance to Juilliard of any junior college in the state.

Notable people
 Jared Goff, NFL quarterback for the Detroit Lions and the Los Angeles Rams, attended Marin Catholic High School.
 Charles S. Kilburn, U.S. Army brigadier general
 Brian McCall, outfielder for Chicago White Sox
 Gavin Newsom, 42nd mayor of San Francisco and 40th governor of California

References

Census-designated places in Marin County, California
Mount Tamalpais
Census-designated places in California